Faveria laiasalis is a species of moth of the  family Pyralidae. It was found by Francis Walker in 1859 and is found in Queensland, Australia.

The wingspan is about 20 mm. The forewings are brown with a dark mark near the base of the inner margin.

The larvae have been reared on Cynodon dactylon.

References

Moths described in 1859
Phycitini
Moths of Australia